The 1997 UCI Mountain Bike World Championships were held in Château-d'Œx, Switzerland from 18 to 21 September 1997. The disciplines included were cross-country and downhill. The event was the 8th edition of the UCI Mountain Bike World Championships and the first to be held in Switzerland.

Medal summary

Men's events

Women's events

Medal table

See also
1997 UCI Mountain Bike World Cup

References

External links
 Results on uci.ch
 Reporting on mountainzone.com

UCI Mountain Bike World Championships
International cycle races hosted by Switzerland
UCI Mountain Bike World Championships
Mountain biking events in Switzerland